Sajid Nadiadwala (born 18 February 1966) is an Indian film producer, writer, and director who works in Hindi cinema. He is the owner of Nadiadwala Grandson Entertainment. Grandson of filmmaker A.K. Nadiadwala, Sajid has written and produced films including Housefull (2010), Baaghi (2016) to directing Kick (2014) that brought him various debutant director awards, and wrote the Marathi film Lai Bhaari that was produced by Riteish Deshmukh.

Early life
Sajid Nadiadwala's grandfather Abdul Karim Nadiadwala came to Bombay from a city called Nadiad, Gujarat in 1955. His grandfather produced hundreds of films in Bombay, including Taj Mahal. The family's base was in Malad, where his grandfather owned theatres, and where they had more than 5,000 acres and streets named after them. Hence, Sajid used to watch films since he was a child. Sajid's father also produced films. Sajid completed his CA and law and later joined J.P. Dutta as an assistant director on Ghulami at age 21.

Career 
Sajid started his career at a very young age, as a production assistant in his uncle's production house before establishing his own production company called "Nadiadwala Grandson Entertainment Pvt Ltd" at the age of 25. In 1992, he produced his first film Zulm Ki Hukumat starring Dharmendra and Govinda. He brought together action stars Akshay Kumar and Suniel Shetty for the first time on big screen with his next, Waqt Hamara Hai (1993).

1996-2006 

His next production was Salman Khan – Sunny Deol starrer Jeet in 1996 that went on to become a huge hit and popularised Sunny's hook step in the song "Yaara O Yaara". His next, starring Salman Khan in a double role, Judwaa, created a benchmark in the actor's life and was recognised as a cult film. Har Dil Jo Pyar Karega starring Salman Khan, Rani Mukherjee and Preity Zinta (2000) and Mujhse Shaadi Karogi (2004) starring Akshay Kumar, Priyanka Chopra and Salman Khan were the next films he produced under his banner. His 2006 film Jaan-E-Mann was commercially unsuccessful.

2007-2014 
Nadiadwala's 2007 release, Heyy Babyy, was a commercial success wherein he launched director Sajid Khan (director). His 2009 production Kambakkht Ishq, for the very first time in Bollywood included the casting of Hollywood stars such as Sylvester Stallone, Denise Richards and Brandon Routh. The film starred Akshay Kumar and Kareena Kapoor in the lead. Nadiadwala described the moment when he signed Sylvester Stallone for the film as historic since he was so star-struck by Stallone, as he was wondering whether he should get an autograph first or get the contract signed.

His first film of 2010, Housefull held a stellar cast of Akshay Kumar, Ritesh Deshmukh, Deepika Padukone, Lara Dutta, Boman Irani, Arjun Rampal and Randhir Kapoor. The film on release became one of the highest grossers and established Housefull as a successful comedy franchise. On 30 September 2010, he announced a sequel to Housefull that would again star Akshay Kumar in the lead. His next film, a love story, Anjaana Anjaani starring Ranbir Kapoor and Priyanka Chopra released on 1 October 2010 and the music of the film was an overnight success with songs like Tujhe bhula Diya and Aas Paas Hai Khuda becoming all time chartbusters. Housefull 2 was released on 5 April 2012 and this franchise film went on to be a huge blockbuster by entering the 100- crore – club, commemorating Nadiadwala Grandson's first 100 crore film. In 2014, Sajid Nadiadwala came out blazing with four successful films including his directorial debut starring close friend Salman Khan, titled Kick, which is one of the All Time Top Grossers in Indian cinema.  His first production in the year 2014 was Highway starring Alia Bhatt and Randeep Hooda, directed by Imtiaz Ali was a success at the box office. His decision to green lit film like Highway brought a lot of appreciation from the industry and audience alike. Next was 2 States, the diverse cultural love story starring Alia Bhatt and Arjun Kapoor in lead roles and directed by Abhishek Varman was yet another 100 crore club that catered to the class as well as mass audience. On 23 May 2014, his first movie starring two debutantes in lead roles Heropanti released. The movie stars Tiger Shroff and Kriti Sanon and has the second-highest opening for a movie starring debutantes.

Nadiadwala made his directorial debut with the July 2014 release Kick, a remake of Ravi Teja's 2009 Telugu film Kick. The film stars Salman Khan and Jacqueline Fernandez as the leads. The film broke all previous Khan records and is one of the top 100 highest-grossing Indian films. Nadiadwala with this film also successfully resurrected Jacqueline Fernandez's Bollywood career and got the actress in many movies. The actress said about her Judwaa 2 producer, Sajid Nadiadwala, admitting that it was he who noticed her before anyone else, giving her the special appearance in Housefull song, "Dhanno" and then going on to cast her in Housefull 2 and his directorial debut, Kick. Fernandez said about the Sajid "My oldest equation is with him, his wife Wardha is my soul sister and I've watched his kids grow in front of my eyes. I'm in the movies because of him and I'll never forget that. I'll always be there for Nadiad and Salman".

2015-2019 
In 2015, Nadiadwala produced Kabir Khan's directorial Phantom starring Saif Ali Khan and Katrina Kaif. The national spy action saga was based on Mumbai Avengers on the aftermath of 26/11 Mumbai attacks and was widely appreciated film. "Afghan Jalebi", a song broke records and became the no.1 chartbusters. Next was the highly talked film, Tamasha starring ex flame Ranbir Kapoor and Deepika Padukone, directed by Imtiaz Ali. The film grossed 100 crore worldwide and is received much love and appreciation by the critics. The music album of the film became an instant super hit and is considered one of the top albums of the decade with songs like "Matargashti" and "Agar Tum Saath Ho" ruling the charts.

In 2016, Sajid Nadiadwala had a yet another successful year, with three back-to-back hits, Baaghi, Housefull 3 and Dishoom. Baaghi, an action adventure film starring his protégé Tiger Shroff along with actress Shraddha Kapoor grossed 100 crore worldwide and established Tiger as an unbeatable action hero. The songs of the film became popular in no time. Next from Nadiadwala's banner, came his biggest Housefull franchise, the third installment of Akshay Kumar starrer. Housefull 3, broke box office records and grossed 107 crore in India. The multi- starrer film will have its sequel coming in Diwali 2019. Nadiadwala announced the fourth installment he said, “Yes, that's right we intend to bring back the entire cast from the earlier Housefull films. Of course Jia Khan is no longer with us. God bless her soul. But all the rest are on. The idea for Housefull 4 came to Nadiadwala in a flash. "I just thought we’ve seen so many serious intense romantic films on the theme of reincarnation, you know Madhumati, Karz etc...why not a funny take on punar-janam? That was my idea. I shared it with my story writers. I thought they would take at least a year or two to crack it. But they came up with a terrific plot within no time. So yeah, here we are all set to do a rip-roaring take on reincarnation. We are looking ahead at making the most expensive comedy ever to come from our production house". Housefull 4 will be set in two time zones. One will be in the current times. The other will be set in Baahubali era where all the characters will get into costumes.

Rangoon, starring Saif Ali Khan, Kangana Ranaut and Shahid Kapoor, was released on 24 February 2017. Sajid Nadiadwala's reboot version of his cult classic Judwaa, once again directed by David Dhawan titled Judwaa 2 broke the dry spell running at the box office in 2017. The film was a blockbuster and was this year's first film to have a great run. The film has become Varun Dhawan's highest-grossing film so far. Nadiadwala recently released Baaghi 2 starring Tiger Shroff and Disha Patani on March 30, 2018. The film has already crossed the 100 crore mark in just 6 days and with this film Tiger Shroff gets his entry in the 100 crore club. The film is a remake to 2016's super hit telugu film kshanam that starred adivi shesh in a lead role. The film earlier was slated to release on April 29, but due to the date shifting this year, Nadiadwala preponed the release date of the film. Nadiadwala is the only filmmaker who has preponed the release of his film, whereas everyone has postponed, showing sheer confidence and also announced the third instalment of the franchise even before the trailer was out.

Sajid Nadiadwala has also produced Nitesh Tiwari's Chhichhore which is released on 6 September 2019.

Nadiadwala is produced the fourth sequel to his Housefull series Housefull 4 release in Diwali 2019. The film is touted to be the biggest Housefull ever with a 75 Crore budget, only for its VFX and SX.

Upcoming projects
Nadiadwala is also launching Ahan Shetty with the Hindi remake of Telugu superhit movie RX 100 which will be directed by Milan Luthria.

Nadiadwala also has 2 projects in development. Nakhre, starring Vicky Kaushal and Disha Patani which will be directed by Tinu Suresh Desai, and a Raju Gadu remake named “Pilfer Singh” with Kartik Aaryan and Shraddha Kapoor as leads and will be directed by Sanjana Reddy.

Personal life 
Nadiadwala married actress Divya Bharti on 10 May 1992. Ten months later, Divya fell from their fifth-storey window at their Tulsi residency and died. She was 19. After Divya's death, he met Warda Khan, a journalist. Khan proposed to Nadiadwala and on 18 November 2000, the two were married. The couple later had two sons.

On 13 June 2021, Nadiadwala along with Sudeep and Nikhil Kamath, Chief Information Officer and co-founder of Zerodha, cheated during an online charity event against five-time world chess champion Vishwanathan Anand. Chess.com suspended their accounts for violating fair play.

Filmography

Awards and nominations

References

External links 
 
Sajid Nadiadwala biography 
Nadiadwala Grandson Entertainment

1966 births
Living people
Indian Muslims
Film producers from Mumbai
Hindi film producers
Film directors from Mumbai
Hindi-language film directors
Memon people
Gujarati people